Lycée Regnault is a French international school in Tangier, Morocco, serving levels collège (junior high school) and lycée (senior high school/sixth form college). The school, first established in 1913, is the oldest French school in Morocco.

References

External links
 Lycée Regnault 

French international schools in Morocco
Schools in Tangier
1913 establishments in Morocco
Educational institutions established in 1913
20th-century architecture in Morocco